The Melbourne Victory A-League 2006–07 season was their most successful A-League season. They defeated Adelaide United 6–0 in their first Grand Final, winning the Championship, Premiership and qualifying for the AFC Champions League 2008.

Season summary

Melbourne began the 2006–07 Hyundai A-League season hoping to vastly improve on their 7th place in the inaugural season. Coach Ernie Merrick had made a number of off-season signings to bolster the squad with skill and experience including 3 Brazilians Alessandro, Claudinho, Fred along with Scottish Premier League player Grant Brebner. After a hugely successful Round 2 fixture against Sydney FC at the Telstra Dome (now the Etihad Stadium) in front of a crowd of 39,730, Melbourne Victory announced that they would move all but one match from Olympic Park to Telstra Dome. Melbourne became the first team to complete the A-League double in the history of the competition; clinching the premiership against the New Zealand Knights 4–0 at Olympic Park with 4 rounds of the A-League season remaining, then beating Adelaide United 6–0 in the Grand Final at a sold out Telstra Dome to take the championship. Melbourne also qualified for the 2008 AFC Champions League as A-League Champions.

Players

First team squad

Transfers
In

Out

Matches

Pre-season friendlies
Melbourne started their 2006-07 pre-season with a number of practise matches against Victorian Premier League clubs. These included a laboured 1–0 win over Richmond SC, a 2–2 draw against Bulleen Zebras, a 4–0 victory against Green Gully, a 7–0 victory of Kingston City FC and 3-0 victories over Altona Magic and Oakleigh Cannons.

Victory also won the QNI North Queensland Trophy by beating leading Chinese Super League team Changchun Yatai 6–1 in the final.  Michael Ferrante scored twice early on and then-trialist Grant Brebner added a spectacular thirty-yard free-kick to make it 3–0 at half-time, while Danny Allsopp scored three times in the second half to seal the win. The competition featured fellow A-League side Central Coast Mariners (Victory won 4–2 on penalties), the Young Socceroos (Victory lost 5–6 on penalties), and Changchun Yatai (Victory won 3–1 in the first meeting).

Melbourne kicked off their A-League Pre-Season Cup campaign with a disappointing 1–0 loss to Adelaide United at Launceston's Aurora Stadium in front of 6,834 spectators. The second match saw them play out a 1–1 draw away to Perth Glory, with Daniel Allsopp scoring Melbourne's only goal.  Back at Olympic Park for the final group match, they were soundly beaten 3-1 by the Central Coast Mariners, ending the club's hopes of progressing to the next round of the competition.  A "bonus round" match finished off the group stage, with the Melbourne defeating Newcastle Jets 3–2.

In the first match of a rather meaningless playoff section involving the lower placed teams of the group stage, Victory defeated the Queensland Roar 4–2 on penalties, having been locked at 0-0 after 120 minutes of play.  The match was held at Epping Stadium in the outer north of Melbourne.  The final match of the pre-season cup saw the Victory defeat Perth Glory 1–0 at Olympic Park in front of 2,215 loyal fans, and finish the competition in 5th place.

2006-07 Hyundai A-League fixtures

2006–07 Finals series

Ladder

2006–07 awards
Victory Medal
Kevin Muscat and Danny Allsopp
Players' Player of the Year
Danny Allsopp
Clubman of the Year
Fred
Golden Boot
Archie Thompson

References

2006-07
2006–07 A-League season by team